Karin van der Haar-Kramp (born 9 May 1977) is a Dutch female Paralympic sitting volleyball player. She is part of the Netherlands women's national sitting volleyball team.

She competed at the  2008 Summer Paralympics finishing third, and 2012 Summer Paralympics  finishing 4th, after losing from Ukraine in the bronze medal match.

On club level she played for Sudosa/SC Bartje in 2012.

See also
 Netherlands at the 2012 Summer Paralympics

References

External links
 Athlete Bio

1977 births
Living people
Dutch amputees
Dutch sitting volleyball players
Dutch sportswomen
Medalists at the 2008 Summer Paralympics
Paralympic volleyball players of the Netherlands
Volleyball players at the 2004 Summer Paralympics
Volleyball players at the 2008 Summer Paralympics
Volleyball players at the 2012 Summer Paralympics
Women's sitting volleyball players
Paralympic medalists in volleyball
Paralympic bronze medalists for the Netherlands
20th-century Dutch women
21st-century Dutch women